The Defense of Volotchayevsk is a 1937 Soviet history drama film directed and written by the Vasilyev brothers.

Plot 
The Japanese squadron arrives at the raid of Vladivostok. The Japanese command landed troops in the Far East to allegedly protect their citizens.

Starring 
 Varvara Myasnikova as Masha
 Nikolai Dorokhin as Andrei
 Lev Sverdlin as Col. Ushujima
 Yuri Lavrov as White Guard Officer
 Boris Chirkov as Old Man
 Boris Blinov as Bublik
 Vladimir Lukin as Egor
 Andrei Apsolon
 Pavel Volkov	
 Valeri Solovtsov
 Sergey Filippov

References

External links 

1937 films
1930s Russian-language films
Soviet drama films
1937 drama films
Soviet black-and-white films